The Asian Handball Federation (AHF) is the governing body of handball and beach handball in Asia. It has 44 member countries, mostly located on the Asian continent, but excludes the transcontinental countries with territory in both Europe and Asia – Azerbaijan, Georgia, Russian Federation and Turkey – which are instead members of European Handball Federation (EHF). Three other states located along the western fringe of Asia – Cyprus, Armenia and Israel – are also EHF members. Hong Kong China and Macau, although not independent countries (both are Special regions of China), are also members of the AHF.

One of IHF's six continental confederations, the AHF was formed officially on 26 August 1974 in Tehran (Imperial State of Iran), on the sidelines of the 7th Asian Games 1974. The AHF headquarters is located in Kuwait City (Kuwait). Its current President is Sheikh Ahmed Al-Fahad Al-Ahmed Al-Sabah from Kuwait who is a member of House of Al Sabah, the ruling family of Kuwait.

History
The Asian Handball Federation (AHF) is in one way absolutely unique: during its history till date it had two Presidents - and they were father and son.

When in 1976 the federation was officially founded and Sheikh Fahad Al-Ahmed Al-Jaber Al-Sabah was elected for president, the committed Sheikh had already put a lot of efforts and preparation work into it. In 1974, during the 7th Asian Games in Tehran (Iran), he applied as head of the Kuwaiti delegation at the executive committee for the inclusion of Handball into the sports programme and the foundation of a continental handball federation. The explanation was easy and convincing: meanwhile handball was widely spread in Asia. The leaders of the Asian Game accepted handball as an official sport and asked the Sheikh to act as interim president and to prepare the statutes of the federation. In this task he was supported by the Secretary General Syed Abul Hassan (Pakistan).

Presidents

 Sheikh Fahad Al-Ahmed Al-Jaber Al-Sabah died on 2 August 1990 during the Iraqi invasion of Kuwait while defending Dasman Palace. Mohammed Ali Abul acted as Acting President till the war finished in 1991.
 Sheikh Ahmed step down from AHF Presidency following a guilty verdict against him in a Swiss forgery trial. Therefore, 1st Vice-President Yoshihide Watanabe was appointed as Acting President till further orders.

Secretary generals

Executive committee
Following is the AHF Executive Committee for 2017 – 2021.

Council
Following is the AHF Council for the term 2021 — 2025.

Commissions
Following are the AHF Commission members for the term 2017 — 2021.

Tournaments

AHF
 Asian Men's Handball Championship
 Asian Women's Handball Championship
 Asian Men's Junior Handball Championship
 Asian Women's Junior Handball Championship
 Asian Men's Youth Handball Championship
 Asian Women's Youth Handball Championship
 Asian Games
 Asian Youth Games

Club
 Asian Club League Handball Championship
 HH Amir Cup Asia The country's redeemer Handball Championship for Men's
 Asian Women's Club League Handball Championship

Beach
 Asian Beach Handball Championship
 Asian Youth Beach Handball Championship
 Asian Beach Games

Zones
West Asia
 West Asian Women's Handball Championship
 West Asian Games

South Asia
 South Asian Men's Handball Championship
 South Asian Women's Handball Championship
 South Asian Games

Southeast Asia
 Southeast Asian Games

East Asia
 East Asian Games

Current champions

(Titles)
(*) Record titles

Disputes
A dispute arises between the International Handball Federation (IHF) and the AHF following a controversial decision to replace referees of opening match of Asian Men's Handball Qualification Tournament for the 2008 Summer Olympics between Kuwait and South Korea played on 1 September 2007 in Toyota (Japan). AHF replaced experienced and IHF nominated German referees Lemme and Ulrich with Jordanian referees Al-Shoubaki and Hirzallah, neither of whom stood on the list of IHF-qualified referees having “IHF Status”, meaning that they had not completed the Global Referees Training Programme (GRTP), a program established by the IHF for the development of IHF-level referees. The Jordanian referee pair completely destroyed the South Korean team with more than 20 wrong decisions only in first half of the match which favoured the Kuwaiti team. IHF COC Chairman Aleksandr Kozhukhov (Russia) who was appointed by IHF as supervisor for the event and member of AHF Technical Committee Khalaf Al-Enezi (Kuwait) intervened into the matter at half-time of the match and asked the referees to be fair but the South Korean team
nevertheless could not get the result in their own favour losing the match by 28–20.

Later, on 17 December 2007, in an IHF Council meeting held in Paris (France), IHF decided not to approve the results of the event conduct by AHF and decided to replay both men's and women's events due to biased referee allegations. AHF objected against this decision and warned all the AHF member federations not to participate in the replay organised by IHF. Only South Korea and Japan participated in the IHF replay and South Korea won both men's and women's matches. On February 5, 2008, AHF imposed a fine of $1000 on both the Japan and South Korea and banned them from participating in any event organised by AHF until the fine is paid.

When the matter becomes that complicated, both AHF and IHF mutually decided to took the case to Court of Arbitration for Sport (CAS) for decision. The Kazakhstan Handball Federation and Kuwait Handball Association also want to become a party in the case but CAS refused their appeal. On 20 May 2008, after hearing all the parties, CAS decided to approve the result of IHF men's replay and also approved the AHF organised women's event results.

Recent events (2022–23)

Members
First level

 Bahrain
 China
 Iran
 Iraq
 Japan
 Kuwait
 Qatar
 Saudi Arabia
 South Korea
 United Arab Emirates
 Oman

Second level

 Chinese Taipei
 Jordan
 Kazakhstan
 Lebanon
 North Korea
 Syria
 Thailand

Third level

 Afghanistan
 Bangladesh
 Bhutan ✝
 Brunei
 Cambodia ✝
 East Timor
 Hong Kong, China
 India
 Indonesia
 Kyrgyzstan
 Laos ✝
 Macau China
 Malaysia
 Maldives
 Mongolia
 Nepal
 Pakistan
 Palestine
 Philippines
 Singapore
 Sri Lanka
 Tajikistan
 Turkmenistan
 Uzbekistan
 Vietnam
 Yemen

 ✝ means non-active member

Sponsors
 Al-Kass Sports Channel
 SK Group
 Molten Corporation
 Gerflor

References

External links
  

 
National members of the International Handball Federation
+Asia
Handball
Handball in Asia
Sports organizations established in 1974
1974 establishments in Asia